The Master of Calamarca (real name José López de los Ríos, fl. first half of 18th century) was a Bolivian artist who created two series of angels painted on the walls of a Catholic church in Calamarca, Bolivia in the Department of La Paz. His works were stylistically close to the artist Leonardo Flores from La Paz (fl. last quarter of 17th century).

The Calamarca church contains two sets of angels, most likely created by the same person. The first contains militant Ángel arcabuceros wielding firearms, with each angel's name written clearly at the bottom; the paintings of the Calamarca church are the most renowned, definitive examples of Ángel arcabucero type and Bolivian angel types in general. The second set depicts androgynous angels wearing billowing capes, elaborate short European-style female dresses and Roman military boots. They are unsigned, but each is carrying an object uniquely identifying the subject as one of Archangels of Palermo. According to a tradition stemming from medieval Palermo, these were seven archangels, venerated in Spain, although only three were recognized by the Church.

See also
Ángeles arcabuceros
Cusco School

References

Sources
 
 
 
 

Bolivian painters
Baroque painters
Cusco School
Calamarca